Robert Hübner (born November 6, 1948) is a German chess grandmaster, chess writer, and papyrologist. He was one of the world's leading players in the 1970s and early 1980s.

Chess career
At eighteen, he was joint winner of the West German Chess Championship.

In 1965 he won, together with Hans Ree, the Niemeyer tournament for European players under 20.

His International Master (IM) title was awarded in 1969 and his Grandmaster (GM) title in 1971. He reached third place in the FIDE world ranking list in 1980.

Between 1971 and 1991 (loss to Jan Timman), Hübner played in four Candidates Tournaments for the World Championship. Three ended in controversial circumstances:
 In 1971, he forfeited a closely contested quarter final to Tigran Petrosian, after blundering a piece in the 7th game in a drawn position.
 In 1980–81, his best result, after winning the quarter and semi final (against the Hungarian players Adorjan and Portisch), he reached the final before losing to Viktor Korchnoi. Hübner forfeited the match after 10 games when he was down 1 point.
 In 1983, he lost a quarter final to Vassily Smyslov in unique circumstances: with the match tied after the original 10 games plus 4 further games, the tie was resolved (in Smyslov's favour) by a spin of a roulette wheel.

At his strongest in the mid-seventies to mid-eighties, Hübner participated in many of the elite tournaments of the day, and was invited at Montreal 1979 (The Tournament of Stars), playing alongside Anatoly Karpov, Mikhail Tal, and Jan Timman. His most notable tournament victories were at Houston 1974, Munich 1979 (shared with Ulf Andersson and Boris Spassky), Rio de Janeiro Interzonal 1979 (shared with Lajos Portisch and Tigran Petrosian), Chicago 1982, Biel 1984 (equal with Vlastimil Hort), Linares 1985 (shared with Ljubomir Ljubojević), and Tilburg 1985 (shared with Anthony Miles and Viktor Korchnoi).

He served as a second  to Nigel Short in the 1993 world championship match against Garry Kasparov.

In 2000 he won, with the German team, a silver medal in the 34th Chess Olympiad in Istanbul.

He remained active on the international circuit into the 2000s but has never been a full-time chess professional due to his academic career.

Playing style

Over the chessboard, Hübner's technique has been described as efficient and ruthless. According to Bill Hartston—"His perfectionist and rather pessimistic approach, however, prevented him from reaching the very top."

Other contributions

Hübner's contributions to chess literature include the study of world champions and extensive analysis of 19th-century chess brilliancies. His recent contributions are detailed analysis and study of the chess games of world champions – notably Bobby Fischer and Alexander Alekhine.

He is the eponym of the Hübner Variation of the Nimzo-Indian Defence: 1.d4 Nf6 2.c4 e6 3.Nc3 Bb4 4.e3 c5 5.Bd3 Nc6 6.Nf3 Bxc3+.

When anti-doping tests were introduced into international chess, Hübner declared his withdrawal from the German national team. He views these tests as bureaucratic power displays that degrade the individual. In his opinion, doping in chess cannot improve the true abilities of a player, only their application. "I am always happy if my opponent's abilities can fully unfold, because then I learn more."

Additionally, Hübner is known as one of the world's best xiangqi players not from China.

Notable games
Robert James Fischer vs. Robert Hübner, Palma de Mallorca iz 1970, Caro–Kann Defense: Breyer Variation (B10), ½–½ A dramatic game with central pawn attacks against the GM Robert James Fischer.
Robert Hübner vs. Raymond Keene, Vienna (Austria) 1972, Modern Defense: King Pawn Fianchetto (B06), 1–0 After a long series of manoeuvres the White pressure on the Black king position peaks in a winning combination.

Notes

References

External links

 
 

1948 births
Living people
Chess grandmasters
Chess Olympiad competitors
German chess players
German papyrologists
German chess writers
Sportspeople from Cologne
Chess theoreticians
German male non-fiction writers